The Jefferson Davis Memorial was a memorial for Jefferson Davis (1808–1889), president of the Confederate States of America from 1861 to 1865, installed along Richmond, Virginia's Monument Avenue, in the United States. The monument was unveiled on Davis' birthday, June 3, 1907, a day celebrated in Virginia and many other Southern states as Confederate Memorial Day. It consisted of a bronze statue of Davis by Richmond sculptor Edward Valentine surrounded by a colonnade of 13 columns represented the Southern states, and a tall Doric column topped by a bronze statue, also by Valentine, representing Southern womanhood.

The statue of Davis was toppled by protesters during the George Floyd protests in June 2020.

Description
The east-facing monument sported a  Doric column topped by a female bronze figure called Vindicatrix, an allegorical representation of Southern womanhood. There were thirteen columns, eleven bronze seals representing the seceding states and two representing states that sent troops for the Confederacy.Two square piers at either end of the colonnade are topped with eagles and faced with plaques. The bronze statues, Vindacatrix and Jefferson Davis in the center – the latter situated atop a block of granite – were designed by Edward Virginius Valentine; the arrangement was planned by William C. Noland.

The statue of Davis shows him with an outstretched arm, lecturing from a history book. The frieze carries words Jefferson Davis spoke in his farewell address to the U.S. Senate on January 21, 1861.

The plaque on the left end of the monument reads [both plaques originally all in caps]:

The plaque on the right end of the monument reads:

History
During the many years required to raise the funds needed for the memorial, various designs and placements in the city were considered. Unveiled in 1907 on Confederate Memorial Day – June 3 – on what would have been Davis' 99th birthday, the monument was funded by the Jefferson Davis Monument Association and the United Daughters of the Confederacy. The unveiling was scheduled in conjunction with a reunion of the United Confederate Veterans, and attracted a large crowd of between 80,000 and 200,000 people.  A parade of veterans followed by prayers and speeches preceded the unveiling, which was effected by one of Davis's daughters, Margaret Davis Hayes, and two of his grandchildren.  

A local newspaper said of the memorial at the time, "The entire monument ... typifies the vindication of Mr. Davis and the cause of the Confederacy for which he stood before the world..."

Removal
During the protests in the wake of the murder of George Floyd, the bronze statue of Davis was torn down by protesters on June 10, 2020. The rest of the monument is pending removal; the statue of Vindicatrix, representing Southern womanhood, on top of the central column was removed by the City of Richmond on July 8, 2020.

The vandalized statue is set to be displayed temporarily at The Valentine in Richmond—a museum whose first president was Edward Virginius Valentine, the statue's sculptor—as part of the museum's "This is Richmond, Virginia" exhibit. The statue is on loan from the Black History Museum and Cultural Center of Virginia. It will be displayed lying horizontally in its "2020 state": there is damage to the statue's head and right arm, and splatters of pink paint remain on the statue, as well as torn pieces of toilet paper around the statue's collar. Valentine curator Christina Vida stated that, "we wanted to make sure that paint stays applied. That the damage that occurred to it when it was pulled down by protesters that it stays just that way."

Gallery

See also
 List of monuments and memorials removed during the George Floyd protests

References
Informational notes

Citations

External links

1907 establishments in Virginia
1907 sculptures
2020 disestablishments in Virginia
Allegorical sculptures in the United States
Buildings and structures in Richmond, Virginia
Monument Avenue
Monuments and memorials in Virginia
Richmond, Virginia
Outdoor sculptures in Richmond, Virginia
Removed Confederate States of America monuments and memorials
Sculptures of men in Virginia
Sculptures of women in Virginia
Vandalized works of art in Virginia
Statues removed in 2020
Monuments and memorials in Virginia removed during the George Floyd protests